Sandflow is a 1937 American Western film directed by Lesley Selander and written by Frances Guihan. The film stars Buck Jones, Lita Chevret, Bob Kortman, Arthur Aylesworth, Bob Terry and Enrique de Rosas. The film was released on February 14, 1937, by Universal Pictures.

Plot
Lane Hallett is wanted for killing the Sheriff, however his brother Buck thinks he is innocent and sets out to prove it, but while he is out Quayle is after Lane for the reward money.

Cast       
Buck Jones as Buck Hallett
Lita Chevret as Rose Porter
Bob Kortman as Quayle
Arthur Aylesworth as Tex 
Bob Terry as Lane Hallett 
Enrique de Rosas as Joaquin 
Josef Swickard as Banker Porter
Lee Phelps as Singing Guard
Harold Hodge as Rillito
Tom Chatterton as Sheriff
Arthur Van Slyke as Santone
Malcolm Graham as Parable
Silver as Silver

References

External links
 

1937 films
1930s English-language films
American Western (genre) films
1937 Western (genre) films
Universal Pictures films
Films directed by Lesley Selander
American black-and-white films
1930s American films